Novi Grad (lit. "New Town") is a municipality of the city of Sarajevo, Bosnia and Herzegovina. It is the westernmost of the four municipalities that make up the city of Sarajevo. The municipality also consists of the villages Bojnik and Rečica.

History
During the 1970s, Sarajevo was undergoing a rapid economic and cultural development, with great expansion focused on population and industry. Novi Grad was a direct result of this period of heavy growth, in which many acres of previously unused land were transformed into socialist urban centres filled with apartment buildings. By the time the Novi Grad municipality was formally recognized, it had some 60,000 citizens, in 18 neighbourhoods.

According to the 1991 census, the municipality of Novi Grad had 136,746 citizens. Four years of the Bosnian War brought that number down tremendously, as the Serb minority left the city. Of the municipality's 33,517 residential buildings, 92% were damaged during the Siege of Sarajevo.

Novi Grad has since made a fantastic recovery. Although many bullet holes and mortar shell impacts are visible throughout the municipality, it is overall healthy and functioning. As the most modern part of Sarajevo, Novi Grad is also ground to many new developments, such as the Bosmal City Center.

Demographics

1971
111,811 total
Serbs - 45,806 (40.96%)
Bosniaks - 37,147 (33.22%)
Croats - 17,491 (15.64%)
Yugoslavs - 5,798 (5.18%)
Others - 5,569 (5.00%)

1991
136,616 total
Bosniaks - 69,430 (50.82%)
Serbs - 37,591 (27.51%)
Croats - 8,889 (6.50%)
Yugoslavs - 15,580 (11.40%)
Others - 5,126 (3.77%)

2002
According to the 2002 estimate, today the municipality of Novi Grad has 122,636 citizens, of which around 94% are Bosniaks, 2% Serbs and 4% Croats.

2005
In 2005, 86% of the population of the municipality were ethnic Bosniaks.

2013
118,553 total
Bosniaks - 99,773 (84.15%)
Croats - 4,947 (4.17%)
Serbs - 4,367 (3.68%)
Others - 9,439 (7.96%)

Communities and neighborhoods in Novi Grad

Boljakov Potok
Staro Hrasno
Otoka
Mojmilo
Švrakino selo
Aneks
Alipašino polje-A Faza
Alipašino polje-B Faza
Alipašino polje-C Faza
Saraj Polje (Vojničko Polje)
Olimpijsko selo Mojmilo
Dobrinja A
Dobrinja B
Dobrinja C
Dobrinja D
Buća potok
Dolac
Alipašin Most II
Ahatovići (Gornji Ahatovići and Donji Ahatovići)
Alipašin Most I
Briješće
Sokolje
Dobroševići

References

External links

Official website

 
Populated places in the Sarajevo Canton